Winton (formerly Merced Colony No. 1, Merced Colony No. 2, and Windfield) is an unincorporated community and census-designated place (CDP) in Merced County, California, United States. Winton was established along the original Santa Fe Railroad. At one time, passenger trains would stop at this location. 

As of the 2020 census, the population of Winton was 11,709, up from 10,613 in 2010.

Geography

History
The Winton post office, transferred from Yam, opened in 1912. The name honors J.E. Winton, county surveyor.

The community was home to the Winton Wrestling Alliance (WWA), a prominent Backyard Wrestling Federation in the late 1990s to mid 2000s.

Demographics

2020

In 2020, Winton, CA had a population of 11.6k people with a median age of 29.6. Between 2019 and 2020 the population of Winton, CA grew from 11,288 to 11,619, a 2.93% increase and its median household income grew from $45,858 to $46,977, a 2.44% increase.

The 5 largest ethnic groups in Winton, CA are Other (Hispanic) (49%), White (Hispanic) (23%), White (Non-Hispanic) (17.7%), Asian (Non-Hispanic) (3.69%), and Two+ (Hispanic) (3.57%). As of 2020, 74.5% of residents are citizens and 37% of Winton, CA residents were born outside of the country (4.3k people).

2010
The 2010 United States Census reported that Winton had a population of 10,613. The racial makeup of Winton was 5,696 (53.7%) White, 175 (1.6%) African American, 140 (1.3%) Native American, 701 (6.6%) Asian, 8 (0.1%) Pacific Islander, 3,455 (32.6%) from other races, and 438 (4.1%) from two or more races. Hispanic or Latino of any race were 7,566 persons (71.3%).

The Census reported that 10,613 people (100% of the population) lived in households, 0 (0%) lived in non-institutionalized group quarters, and 0 (0%) were institutionalized.

There were 2,718 households, out of which 1,645 (60.5%) had children under the age of 18 living in them, 1,563 (57.5%) were opposite-sex married couples living together, 472 (17.4%) had a female householder with no husband present, 266 (9.8%) had a male householder with no wife present.  There were 203 (7.5%) unmarried opposite-sex partnerships, and 24 (0.9%) same-sex married couples or partnerships. 316 households (11.6%) were made up of individuals, and 137 (5.0%) had someone living alone who was 65 years of age or older. The average household size was 3.90.  There were 2,301 families (84.7% of all households); the average family size was 4.19.

The population was spread out, with 3,934 people (37.1%) under the age of 18, 1,261 people (11.9%) aged 18 to 24, 2,823 people (26.6%) aged 25 to 44, 1,926 people (18.1%) aged 45 to 64, and 669 people (6.3%) who were 65 years of age or older.  The median age was 25.6 years. For every 100 females, there were 100.9 males.  For every 100 females age 18 and over, there were 99.7 males.

The homeowner vacancy rate was 4.3%; the rental vacancy rate was 10.4%.  5,366 people (50.6% of the population) lived in owner-occupied housing units and 5,247 people (49.4%) lived in rental housing units.

2000
As of the census of 2000, there were 8,832 people, 2,343 households, and 1,949 families residing in the CDP. The racial makeup of the CDP was 44.28% White, 2.33% African American, 1.08% Native American, 5.36% Asian, 0.34% Pacific Islander, 41.00% from other races, and 5.62% from two or more races. Hispanic or Latino of any race were 62.19% of the population.

There were 2,343 households, out of which 54.5% had children under the age of 18 living with them, 60.4% were married couples living together, 15.5% had a female householder with no husband present, and 16.8% were non-families. 12.6% of all households were made up of individuals, and 4.7% had someone living alone who was 65 years of age or older.  The average household size was 3.77 and the average family size was 4.11.

In the CDP, the population was spread out, with 39.1% under the age of 18, 12.0% from 18 to 24, 27.6% from 25 to 44, 15.3% from 45 to 64, and 6.0% who were 65 years of age or older.  The median age was 24 years. For every 100 females, there were 100.2 males.  For every 100 females age 18 and over, there were 100.1 males.

The median income for a household in the CDP was $19,787, and the median income for a family was $19,834. Males had a median income of $16,832 versus $11,676 for females. The per capita income for the CDP was $10,451.  About 23.5% of families and 28.8% of the population were below the poverty line, including 38.8% of those under age 18 and 13.5% of those age 65 or over.

Politics
In the state legislature Winton is located in the 12th Senate District, represented by Republican Anthony Cannella, and in the 21st Assembly District, represented by Democrat Adam Gray.

Notable residents
Bernard Berrian, NFL receiver for the Minnesota Vikings

References

Census-designated places in Merced County, California
Census-designated places in California
1912 establishments in California
Populated places established in 1912